Lyubov Fedorovna Blizhina (also transliterated Lubov; born June 11, 1947) is a member of the State Duma for the LDPR. She is a member of the Committee on Cultural affairs of the State Duma.
She graduated  from the Tambov branch of the Moscow Institute for the Soviet Culture.

References

1947 births
Living people
Fourth convocation members of the State Duma (Russian Federation)
Liberal Democratic Party of Russia politicians